Osmanthus cake (Chinese: 桂花糕;pinyin: guì huā gāo) is a traditional sweet-scented Chinese pastry made with glutinous rice flour, honey sweet-scented osmanthus and rock sugar. It has crystal clear, sweet, and soft waxy characteristics.

History 
Sweet-scented osmanthus cake originated in China during the Ming Dynasty. Though its exact origin is unclear, folk tales have it that the poet Yang Shen dreamed of visiting the moon in order to take the imperial exam. In the dream, he saw a magnificent palace and a huge and sweet-smelling osmanthus plant. He picked it and brought it back with him to earth. Toward the end of the Ming Dynasty, a peddler from Xindu named Liu Jixiang was inspired by this story to collect fresh osmanthus flowers. He extracted their essential oils, strained them over sugar and mixed them with glutinous rice to produce the familiar form of the sweet we know today. It is now a Xindu specialty.

See also
 List of pastries
Dim sum
Chinese desserts

References

Chinese pastries